Surat Thani is a city in Amphoe Mueang Surat Thani, Surat Thani Province, southern Thailand. It is the capital of Surat Thani Province. The city's population density is 1,914 inhabitants per km2. 

Surat Thani is located near the mouth of the Tapi River on the Gulf of Thailand. The city offers no major tourist attractions in itself, and is mainly known to tourists as the jumping-off point to Ko Samui, Ko Tao, and Ko Pha Ngan. It is the regional commercial center, with a seaport dealing in the main products of the province, rubber and coconuts.

Toponymy
The city received its name, which means "city of good people", by King Vajiravudh (Rama VI) in 1915. The name was given to the city due to the intense devotion of the locals to Buddhism. Previously the city was known as Bandon, meaning "village on higher ground". The name of the city is taken from the Indian city Surat in Gujarat on the Indian River Tapi. King Vajiravudh (Rama VI) gave this name to his city as he was impressed with the Indian city.

History
On 4 May 2007, the town was upgraded to city status (thesaban nakhon).

Transportation

Rail
Surat Thani is connected with Bangkok by the Southern Line of the State Railway of Thailand. Surat Thani Railway Station is the main station of the province.

Road
Surat Thani is connected to Nakhon Si Thammarat by Route 401. Asian highway AH2 also passes the city at Phunphin.

Air

Water
There are three main ferry companies that operate from mainland Surat Thani to the islands: Lomprayah, Seatran, and Raja.

There are only two ferry piers in Muang Surat Thani: Tapee Pier, which Lomprayah's High Speed Catarman operates from, and Bandon Pier, which is for night boats only. Seatran Pier and Raja Pier are both located in Don Sak District, 65km (40mi) east of the city centre.

Climate
Surat Thani has a tropical monsoon climate (Köppen climate classification Aw). Like other parts of Southern Thailand, Surat Thani has only two seasons; wet and dry. Temperatures are fairly stable throughout the year, although the pre-monsoon months (March–May) are somewhat hotter. There is a short dry season from January to April, followed by the wet season that lasts from May to December. The heaviest rains occur in October and November.

Culture

Festivals 
 Chak Phra - Celebrating Buddha's symbolic return to earth at the end of Buddhist Lent. Parade, floats and long-boat races.
 Tham Bun Dern Sip (ทำบุญเดือนสิบ) - Southern Thai Festival of the Tenth Lunar Month
 Surat Food Fair – Held annually in March (2019 dates: 8-16 March) along the Tapi River. The largest food festival in Southern Thailand.
 Surat Thani Vegetarian Festival - Held annually in October (2018 dates: 8-15 October). Parades, more vegetarian options in restaurants and shops, and free food at the Chinese temples
 Songkran - Thai New Year Festival
 Loi Krathong -

Sports
Surat Thani is home to the  Surat Thani Football Club (nicknamed “Police Tero”, previously known as “The Roosters”) and the Surat Thani Futsal Club (nicknamed “The Chargers”).

Education

Colleges and universities
 Prince of Songkla University (PSU), Surat Thani Campus
 Surat Thani Rajabhat University (SRU)
 Tapee University
 Suratthani Technical College
 Surat Thani Vocational Education College
 Surat Commercial Technology College
 Surat Thani Polytechnic College

Primary and secondary
Primary and secondary schools with English instruction include:
 Surat Thani International School (STIS)
 Oonrak International Bilingual School
 Joy Bilingual School
 Sarasas Witaed Suratthani School

Secondary
 Suratthani School

Hospitals
Ministry of Public Health
Surat Thani Hospital - public hospital
Suan Saranrom Hospital - psychiatric hospital
Suratthani Cancer Hospital - cancer hospital
 Military
Fort Wiphavadirangsit Hospital - military hospital
 Private
Bangkok Hospital Surat -  private hospital
Thaksin Hospital -  private hospital

Administration

The administration of Surat Thani city municipality is responsible for an area that covers 68.97 square kilometers (26.63 square miles) and consists of six subdistricts, 18 villages (muban), 132,040 people in 74,548 households.

Notable people

References

External links

Surat Thani City Website (Thai only)

Surat Website 

 
Populated places in Surat Thani province
Cities and towns in Thailand